Viva Motorsports (known at various points in its existence as Motorway Motorsports and Viva Motorsports with Frank Cicci) is a former American stock car racing team.  It fielded cars for several drivers, but mainly Jamie Dick in the NASCAR Xfinity Series from 2011 to 2015.  The team also competed in the NASCAR Camping World Truck Series, and was owned by Jimmy Dick.

Xfinity Series

Car No. 02 History 
Dick ran two races with this car number in 2011, finishing 30th at Kentucky and 34th at Iowa.

Car No. 52 History 
Dick ran one race with this car number in 2011, finishing 34th at Texas.

Car No. 55 History 

In 2013, the team ran Dick in 17 races and David Starr in two races.  Dick recorded the team's best finish, a 12th in the Talladega spring race.  The team failed to qualify for one race at Richmond.

In 2014, Dick ran 21 races while Ross Chastain ran two races.  Chastain had the best finish, an 18th at Charlotte.

In 2015, the team had Dick run five races, Jeffrey Earnhardt in six and Brandon Gdovic in two. Earnhardt recorded the best finish, a 12th at Talladega.

Camping World Truck Series

Truck No. 86 History 

Dick ran six races and failed to qualify for one in 2010.  He recorded a best finish of 16th at Iowa.

Truck No. 02 History 

Dick ran four races and failed to qualify for one with this number in 2011. He recorded a best finish of 23rd at Iowa.

Ceasing operations 

On June 15, 2015, a team press release cited a lack of funding and Dick's diagnosis of diabetes as reasons to shut down.  The teams assets were sold to Rick Gdovic to form Precision Performance Motorsports.  The team had wrecked four cars in the month of May alone.

References

Defunct NASCAR teams
NASCAR Xfinity Series